Tyutyunche is a village in Dzhebel Municipality, Kardzhali Province, southern Bulgaria.

It is a mixed village with a  Turkish majority and a large  Bulgarian minority.

References

Villages in Kardzhali Province